Art of Eternity is a series of 3 1-hour documentaries on Christian art presented by Andrew Graham-Dixon.  It was first broadcast on BBC Four in 2007, and later repeated on BBC Two.

Episode guide
Painting Paradise – The origins of Christian art in late antiquity, Coptic Egypt and medieval France, and its transition from classical art.
The Glory of Byzantium – Icons and the other Christian art of the Byzantine Empire.
When East Meets West – Early Christian art's development through the Middle Ages and Renaissance, and its influence on modern artists.

External links
 

2007 British television series debuts
BBC television documentaries about history
Christian art
Byzantine art